Fred Ross may refer to:
 Fred Ross (community organizer)
 Fred Ross (American football)
 Fred Ross (artist)